2016 Cactus Bowl can refer to:

 2016 Cactus Bowl (January), played as part of the 2015–16 college football bowl season between the Arizona State Sun Devils and the West Virginia Mountaineers
 2016 Cactus Bowl (December), played as part of the 2016–17 college football bowl season between the Baylor Bears and the Boise State Broncos